Sediminibacillus  is a genus of bacteria from the family of Bacillaceae. Sediminibacillus species are halophilic bacteria and found in salty human stools and marine sponges. Sediminibacillus species are identified from Plakortis dariae sponge of the Saint Martin's island of the Bay of Bengal, Bangladesh.

References

Further reading 
 
 

 

Bacillaceae
Bacteria genera